Ganstead is a village in the East Riding of Yorkshire, England, in an area known as Holderness.
It is divided into Ganstead East and Ganstead West by the A165 road which passes through the village.

Ganstead forms part of the civil parish of Bilton.

In 1823 Ganstead was in the parish of Swine and in the Wapentake and Liberty of Holderness. Population at the time was 61 and included four farmers and a corn miller.

References

External links

Villages in the East Riding of Yorkshire
Holderness